Major-General John Burton Forster  (1856 – 13 June 1938) was a British Army officer.

Military career
Educated at the Royal Military College, Sandhurst, Forster was commissioned into the Royal Irish Regiment on 23 November 1872. After seeing action in the Second Anglo-Afghan War in 1879 and then the Nile Expedition in 1884, he became commanding officer of the Kurram-Kohat Force in India in December 1897. He went on to be Assistant Adjutant-General at the Headquarters of the Bengal Command in 1902, brigadier-general commanding the Regimental Districts in Southern Ireland in May 1907 and commander of the Quetta Brigade in India in April 1910.

Forster returned to the UK to become General Officer Commanding 55th (West Lancashire) Division in September 1914 at the start of the First World War. Due to the casualties suffered by the British Expeditionary Force (BEF) during the opening months of fighting on the Western Front, the division's volunteers were used as reinforcements. After the division's last remaining infantry formation of volunteers departed, he became General Officer Commanding 57th (2nd West Lancashire) Division in April 1915 before retiring in early 1917. He was appointed a Companion of the Order of the Bath on 24 January 1917.

He was honorary colonel of the Royal Irish Regiment from 1918 to 1922.

References

|-

1856 births
1938 deaths
British Army major generals
Companions of the Order of the Bath
Royal Irish Regiment (1684–1922) officers
British Army generals of World War I
Graduates of the Royal Military College, Sandhurst
British military personnel of the Second Anglo-Afghan War